The Library of Michigan is a state-run library and historical center located in Lansing, Michigan that was created to provide one perpetual state institution to collect and preserve Michigan publications, conduct reference and research, and support libraries statewide. Previously under the Michigan Department of History, Arts and Libraries state agency and, as of 2009, under the Michigan Department of Education, the library is Michigan’s official state library agency. A notable side-project of the Library of Michigan is the Michigan eLibrary (MeL), one of the first online libraries on the Internet. MeL provides full-text articles, books, Michigan history materials, and evaluated web sites to residents of the state of Michigan. In 2003, the Library of Michigan Board of Trustees elected as chair Elaine Didier, dean of Oakland University's Kresge Library and professor at Oakland University.

History
In 1828, a territorial library was created containing laws and government documents for use by the territorial council, and William B. Hunt was appointed the territorial librarian. Nine years later, the former territorial library became the state library, and Governor Stevens T. Mason appointed Oren Marsh as the first state librarian.

In 1879, the state library moved to the new State Capitol in Lansing. It was originally a two-story room on the second and third floor in the west wing. The space is now the Speaker's Library on the second floor and the House Appropriations Committee room on the third floor.

A fire in the State Office Building where the library was housed in 1951 destroyed 20,000 books and damaged 30,000 more.

Public Act 540 of 1982 created the Library of Michigan and transferred control of the library from the Department of Education to the Legislative Council. Three years later, the Library of Michigan Foundation, which secures funds to support the library’s priority programs and projects, was established. In 1988, the Michigan Library and Historical Center opened, tripling the Library of Michigan’s space and merging its full collection of books in one place for the first time since the 1951 fire.

In 2001, the library was moved to the new Department of History, Arts and Libraries. After that department's abolition in 2009, the library was moved back to the Department of Education.

Building

Opened in 1989, the Library of Michigan building also contains one of the ten largest genealogical collections in the United States. Another feature is a Michigan collection containing legal materials that date back centuries. Other features of the library and historical center include the Michigan Historical Museum, the Archives of Michigan, and newspapers on microfilm from papers all over the state. Also the State Law Library moved to the building in the summer of 2007.

See also 
 MichiCard

References

External links
Official website
Michigan eLibrary homepage
St. Ignace Michigan Public Library

1828 establishments in Michigan Territory
Buildings and structures in Lansing, Michigan
Education in Lansing, Michigan
History museums in Michigan
Libraries in Michigan
Library buildings completed in 1989
Museums in Lansing, Michigan
Michigan